Maromitety is a town and commune in Madagascar. It belongs to the district of Vavatenina, which is a part of Analanjirofo Region. The population of the commune was estimated to be approximately 18,000 in 2001 commune census.

Only primary schooling is available. The majority 96% of the population of the commune are farmers.  The most important crop is rice, while other important products are bananas, coffee and cloves.  Services provide employment for 4% of the population.

References and notes 

Populated places in Analanjirofo